Bruce Mouat (born 27 August 1994 in Edinburgh) is a Scottish curler. He is an Olympic silver medallist, having skipped Great Britain to a second place finish in the men's team event at the 2022 Winter Olympics.

Career
Mouat had a very successful junior career, winning two Scottish junior championships in 2015 and 2016. He skipped the Scottish team at the 2015 World Junior Curling Championships, where he led his team of Duncan Menzies, Derrick Sloan and Angus Dowell to a bronze medal. The team had a 6-3 round robin record, which was good enough for third place. They lost to Sweden in the 3 vs. 4 playoff game but won in a re-match against the Swedes in the bronze medal game. Mouat would again skip Scotland at the 2016 World Junior Curling Championships, this time with teammates Bobby Lammie, Gregor Cannon along with Dowell again. The team posted a 7-2 record after the round robin, in second place. In the playoffs, they would beat the United States in the 1 vs. 2 game and beat them again in the final to claim the gold medal.

Mouat would skip the British team at the 2017 Winter Universiade. He led the team of Lammie, Cannon and Sloan to an undefeated record en route to claiming the gold medal.

Mouat has represented Scotland at five World Mixed Doubles Curling Championships with partner Gina Aitken. At the 2013 World Mixed Doubles Curling Championship, they finished 7th; in 2014, they finished 9th; in 2016, they finished fourth (their best finish to date), and in 2017 they finished in 11th place.

Mouat won his first tournament on the World Curling Tour at the 2015 Dumfries Challenger Series along with teammates Menzies, Lammie and Cannon. He played in his first Grand Slam event at the 2016 Humpty's Champions Cup due to his winning the 2016 World Junior title. His rink managed a 2-2 record there before losing to Steve Laycock's team in a tiebreaker.

Mouat won his second WCT event at the 2017 Stu Sells Oakville Tankard with teammates Grant Hardie, Bobby Lammie and Hammy McMillan Jr. It was the beginning of a very successful 2017–18 curling season. The team stayed in Oakville and won the Biosteel Oakville Fall Classic the following week, defeating the same team, Kim Chang-min of Korea, in the final. Later in the season, the Mouat rink would once again beat Kim in another final, this time at the 2017 Boost National. Team Mouat won the event, capturing his first career Grand Slam title, and became the youngest skip and only the second-ever non-Canadian skip ever to win a men's Grand Slam event. Later in the season, he won the Dumfries Challenger Series and Aberdeen International Curling Championship back home in Scotland. He also won his first Scottish Men's Curling Championship in 2018. This qualified his team to represent Scotland at the 2018 World Men's Curling Championship. His team finished the round robin with an 11–1 tie for first, but lost in the semifinal to Canada but went on to beat Kim Chang-min's South Korean team in the bronze medal game. Mouat played in three other slams that season, failing to qualify at the Canadian Open, making it to the quarterfinals of the Players' Championship and the semifinals at the Champions Cup.

Mouat's first major bonspiel of the 2018–19 curling season came in September at the first leg of the Curling World Cup, where he led his team to a third-place finish. Two weeks later, he played in the Elite 10 Grand Slam event, where his team won just one game. A month later, he was more successful at the Masters Grand Slam, making it to the semifinals. A month later, Mouat made his debut at the 2018 European Curling Championships. After finishing the round robin there with a 7–2 record, Mouat beat Italy and Sweden in the playoffs to claim the gold medal. Mouat wrapped up the calendar year with another third-place finish at the second leg of the Curling World Cup and losing in the finals of the 2018 National in the first all-Scotland Grand Slam final against Ross Paterson. The team began 2019 by winning the Mercure Perth Masters, followed by a quarterfinal finish at the 2019 Canadian Open. The team then returned to Scotland to defend their Scottish championship, which they won, sending them on a trip to the 2019 World Men's Curling Championship. There, Mouat led the team to an 8–4 round robin record and then lost to Canada in the playoffs. To wrap the season up, Mouat lost in a tiebreaker at the 2019 Players' Championship and made it to the semifinals at the 2019 Champions Cup (curling).

Team Mouat played in four slams during the 2019–20 curling season, making it to the semifinals at the 2019 Masters and 2019 National, losing in a tiebreaker at the 2019 Tour Challenge, and making it to the quarterfinals of the 2020 Canadian Open. The team won just one event on Tour, defending their championship at the Mercure Perth Masters. In February, Team Mouat won the Scottish Men's Championship again, and Mouat himself won the Scottish Mixed Doubles Curling Championship with Jennifer Dodds a few weeks later. By March, the season had ended abruptly due to the outbreak of the COVID-19 pandemic.

For much of the 2020–21 curling season, there was not much of a Tour due to the pandemic, but Mouat and his team won a series of domestic Challenges put on by the British Curling Association, including a series of mixed doubles wins with Dodds. A "curling bubble" was set up in Calgary, Canada, in the Spring, which hosted several events, including the 2021 World Men's Curling Championship and two slams. Mouat represented Scotland at the 2021 Worlds, leading his team to a 9–4 round robin record. In the playoffs, they beat Canada, and RCF (Russia), making it to the final, where they lost to Sweden, skipped by Niklas Edin. A week later, Team Mouat played in the 2021 Champions Cup in the same bubble, winning the event, defeating Team Brendan Bottcher (who had been Team Canada at the Worlds) to claim their second career Slam title. The team continued their impressive run in the bubble during the next event, the 2021 Players' Championship. They would go through pool play as the only undefeated team on both the men's and women's sides with a 5-0 record, earning the team a bye to the semifinals. They continued their undefeated streak in the playoffs, winning the semis and the finals against Brad Gushue to win their second straight Slam title in just six days.

At the 2021 World Mixed Doubles Championship, Mouat and Dodds finished first in their round-robin group, only losing one game. They defeated Team Canada in the semifinals in the playoffs and then Team Norway in the final to win the gold medal. Their finish also qualified Great Britain for the mixed doubles discipline at the 2022 Winter Olympics.

In October 2021, Mouat was announced by British Curling to be the first British curler to represent the country in both the mixed doubles and men’s team disciplines. He and Dodds would compete in the mixed doubles event, along with his regular team and fifth Ross Whyte in the men’s tournament. Mouat had another stellar season in 2021–22. His team started the year by winning the 2021 Stu Sells Oakville Tankard, and then followed that up with winning the 2021 Masters, the 2021 National, and the 2021 European Curling Championships before heading into the Olympics. At the Olympics, he led Great Britain to an 8–1 round robin record, in first place overall. In the playoffs, he beat the defending champion John Shuster rink from the United States before losing the gold medal to Sweden, skipped by Niklas Edin. He had less success in the mixed doubles discipline, going 6–3 in the round robin. In the mixed doubles playoffs, he and Dodds lost to Norway in the semifinal and Sweden in the bronze medal game. Team Mouat continued their success after the Olympics, winning their third slam of the season at the 2022 Players' Championship. The team was awarded the Pinty's Cup as the season's best Grand Slam team after their win. In their final event of the season, Team Mouat finally faltered, failing to qualify for the playoffs at the 2022 Champions Cup.

Personal life
Until 2017, Mouat was a student at Edinburgh Napier University and is a member of the Gogar Park Curling Club. He lives in Stirling, Scotland. Mouat is openly gay.

Grand Slam record

References

External links

Living people
1994 births
Scottish male curlers
Curlers from Edinburgh
Curlers from Stirling
Alumni of Edinburgh Napier University
Universiade medalists in curling
European curling champions
Continental Cup of Curling participants
Universiade gold medalists for Great Britain
Competitors at the 2017 Winter Universiade
World mixed doubles curling champions
Scottish LGBT sportspeople
Gay sportsmen
LGBT curlers
21st-century LGBT people
Curlers at the 2022 Winter Olympics
Medalists at the 2022 Winter Olympics
Olympic silver medallists for Great Britain
Olympic medalists in curling
Olympic curlers of Great Britain
Scottish Olympic medallists